Forces Armées CA is an association football club in the Central African Republic based in Bangui.

The team plays in the Central African Republic Second Division.

In 1991 the team the Central African Republic League.

Stadium
Currently the team plays at the 35000 capacity Barthelemy Boganda Stadium.

Honours
Central African Republic League: 1991, 1995

References

External links

Football clubs in the Central African Republic
Bangui
Military association football clubs